Antonio Vacca (8 August 1934 – 22 December 2020) was an Italian Roman Catholic bishop.

Vacca was born in Italy and was ordained to the priesthood in 1957. He served as bishop of the Roman Catholic Diocese of Alghero-Bosa, Italy, from 1994 to 2006.

He died of throat cancer.

Notes

1934 births
2020 deaths
20th-century Italian Roman Catholic bishops
Deaths from throat cancer
21st-century Italian Roman Catholic bishops